CPO may refer to:

Occupations
 Certified Professional Organizer
 Certified Protection Officer, a professional certification for security officers from the International Foundation for Protection Officers
 Chief people officer, a corporate official in charge of human resources
 Chief Performance Officer of the United States
 Chief petty officer, a naval military rank
 Chief privacy officer, an executive responsible for managing issues of privacy laws and policies
 Chief process officer, an executive responsible for defining processes rules and guidelines for an organization to follow
 Chief procurement officer, an executive responsible for supply management
 Chief product officer, or chief production officer, an executive responsible for product/production management and development
 Close Protection Operative/Officer (Bodyguard)
 Certified Prosthetists Orthotists, professionals working as a Prosthetist and Orthotist
 City Police Officer, the city police chief in Pakistan, previously referred to as the Superintendent of Police

Orchestras
 Calgary Philharmonic Orchestra, in Calgary, Alberta, Canada
 Cape Town Philharmonic Orchestra, in Cape Town, South Africa
 China Philharmonic Orchestra, in Beijing, China
 Cleveland Philharmonic Orchestra, in Cleveland, Ohio

Other
 Chelsea Pitch Owners, owners of a football ground in London
 CPO (group), a 1990s rap duo from California
 CPO Commerce, Inc., an American online retail company
 Certified Pre-Owned, a qualification for a used vehicle
 Chamonate Airport (IATA airport code), Copiapó, Chile
 Charge Point Operator installs and maintains charge stations
 Chloride peroxidase, an enzyme
 Classic Produktion Osnabrück, a German classical music record label
 Code of Openness, or Code of PLM Openness, initiative of ProSTEP iViP Association for openness in the internet of things
 Commodity pool operator, a person of business that pools together investments for trading in commodity futures or commodity options
 Community post office, a type of post office in the United States Postal Service
 Complete partial order, a term used in mathematical order theory
 Compulsory purchase order, a legal function in the UK and Ireland whereby the government can appropriate real property
 Crude palm oil, unprocessed palm oil
 Crystallographic preferred orientation, see Texture (crystalline), the preferred orientation of crystal axes as a result of deformation

See also
 Central Post Office (disambiguation), the main post office located in every city of United Arab Emirates